Cyclolaelaps is a genus of mites in the family Laelapidae.

Species
 Cyclolaelaps circularis Ewing, 1933

References

Laelapidae